Pellegrini's Cabinet is the former government of Slovakia, headed by prime minister Peter Pellegrini. It was formed on 22 March 2018, after the Prime Minister Robert Fico resigned, as a result of the popular protests following the murder of Ján Kuciak and his fiancée, Martina Kušnírová. According to the Slovak Constitution, if the Prime Minister resigns, the entire government resigns as well. Nevertheless, the composition of the government was to a large extent the same as the previous government. All members of the Smer-SD, SNS and Most-Híd parties supported the re-constructed government.

The cabinet was approved by the National Council on 26 March 2018 with an 81-61 vote, while protests erupted in the streets of Bratislava. It was replaced by the Cabinet of Igor Matovič after the 2020 parliamentary election.

Breakdown by party nomination

Composition
There are several changes compared to the previous government, that came up from the last elections. Besides a few ministers who were replaced, the make-up of the Deputy Prime Ministers also changed. Peter Pellegrini, who became the Prime Minister, was replaced by Richard Raši, as the Deputy Prime Minister for Investment and Informatization. The Deputy Prime Minister and the Minister of Interior Robert Kaliňák was replaced for a short time by Tomáš Drucker, who previously served as the Minister of Health. He was replaced by Andrea Kalavská on that position. Drucker, however, resigned only after three weeks in the position. Instead of removing the President of the Police from his office, which the protests demanded, he resigned himself. He stated that he could not feel authentic in a position that polarises the society. Denisa Saková, former Deputy of Interior Minister Kaliňák, was named the Minister after him. Other changes on the Ministerial posts included Lucia Žitňanská, who refused to be a Minister in the re-formed government. She was replaced by Gábor Gál on her post. The last change happened on the post of the Minister of Culture. Marek Maďarič resigned shortly after the protests set about. He was replaced by Ľubica Laššáková. Ministers who also serve as Deputy Prime Ministers also changed. Minister of Finance, Minister of Agriculture and Minister of the Environment replaced those of Interior Ministry and Ministry of Justice. Recently, Andrea Kalavská resigned on 17 December 2019 and László Sólymos on 28 January 2020.

Notes
(SD) Smer–SD nominee(SNS) Slovak National Party nominee

See also 
Fico's First Cabinet
Fico's Second Cabinet
Fico's Third Cabinet

References

Government of Slovakia
2018 establishments in Slovakia
Cabinets established in 2018
Direction – Social Democracy
Slovak government cabinets
Cabinets disestablished in 2020
2020 disestablishments in Slovakia